The Nationalliga A is the highest league level of American football in Switzerland and was formed in 1982. The first Swiss Bowl championship was played in 1986. Below the Nationalliga A sits the Nationalliga B, also made up of six teams. The champion of the B division has the opportunity to earn promotion to the top division through a relegation/promotion match. There is also a National League C.  

The league season runs from late March to the end of June, followed by the play-offs and the Swiss Bowl which is held in July. The winners of the Swiss Bowl qualifies for the European Football League.

2022 teams 
 Calanda Broncos
 Zurich Renegades
 Thun Tigers
 Winterthur Warriors
 Bern Grizzlies
 Geneva Seahawks
 Basel Gladiators

Recent seasons
Recent club by club final placings in the league:

Notable: players and coaches

 Kevin Burke (quarterback)

 Chris Markey

 Dave Ritchie (Canadian football)

 Todd Hendricks

 Sasha Glavic

 Randy Hippeard

 Bill Ramseyer

 Adam Rita

 Tony Simmons (gridiron football)

 Hugh Mendez

 Evan Harrington

 J.C. Williams

 DJ Wolfe

 Tissi Robinson

 Rex Stapleton

 Nick Gotovac

 Clark Evans

References

External links

  Official Swissbowl website
  Swiss American Football Association website
  Football History Historic American football tables from Germany and Europe

American football in Switzerland
American football leagues in Europe
1982 establishments in Switzerland
Sports leagues established in 1982
Professional sports leagues in Switzerland
American expatriate players of American football